The Winter of Terror was a three-month period during the winter of 1950–1951 during which an unprecedented number of avalanches took place in the Alps in Switzerland, Austria and Italy. The series of 649 avalanches killed over 265 people and caused large amounts of damage to residential and other human-made structures..

Damage and casualties
Austria suffered the most damage and loss of human life with 135 killed and many villages destroyed. Thousands of acres of economically valuable forest in both Austria and Switzerland, were also damaged during the period.

The Valais canton of Switzerland suffered 92 human deaths, approximately 500 cattle deaths, and destruction of 900 human-made structures. As in Austria, economically important forests were also damaged during the period.

The Swiss town of Andermatt in the Adula Alps was hit by six avalanches within a 60-minute period, resulting in 13 deaths.

Causes
More than 600 buildings were destroyed and over 40,000 people were buried under snow.

References

20th-century avalanches
1951 in Austria
1951 in Switzerland
1951 in Italy
Winter
Winter
Winter
1951 natural disasters
Winter weather events
1950 in Austria
1950 in Switzerland
1950 in Italy
1950 natural disasters
Avalanches in Austria
Avalanches in Italy
Avalanches in Switzerland
1950 disasters in Europe 
1951 disasters in Europe